Penkridge weather station is a weather station at Penkridge in Staffordshire, England, operated by the Met Office. It is situated on the site of Rodbaston College.

The station is 101 m above mean sea level.

Below are the 1981-2010 averages.

External links
Met office: Penkridge 1961-1990 averages
Met office: Penkridge 1971-2000 averages

Buildings and structures in Staffordshire
Meteorological stations
weather station
Met Office